Van der Waerden's theorem states that for any positive integers r and k there exists a positive integer N such that if the integers {1, 2, ..., N} are colored, each with one of r different colors, then there are at least k integers in arithmetic progression all of the same color. The smallest such N is the van der Waerden number W(r, k).

Tables of Van der Waerden numbers

There are two cases in which the van der Waerden number W(r, k) is easy to compute: first, when the number of colors r is equal to 1, one has W(1, k) = k for any integer k, since one color produces only trivial colorings RRRRR...RRR (for the single color denoted R). Second, when the length k of the forced arithmetic progression is 2, one has W(r, 2) = r + 1, since one may construct a coloring that avoids arithmetic progressions of length 2 by using each color at most once, but using any color twice creates a length-2 arithmetic progression. (For example, for r = 3, the longest coloring that avoids an arithmetic progression of length 2 is RGB.) There are only seven other van der Waerden numbers that are known exactly.  The table below gives exact values and bounds for values of W(r, k); values are taken from Rabung and Lotts except where otherwise noted.

{| class="wikitable"
! k\r
! 2 colors
! 3 colors
! 4 colors
! 5 colors
! 6 colors
|-
| 3
| style="text-align:right;"| 9 
| style="text-align:right;"| 27  
| style="text-align:right;"| 76  
| style="text-align:right;"| >170  
| style="text-align:right;"| >223  
|-
| 4
| style="text-align:right;" | 35 
| style="text-align:right;"| 293  
| style="text-align:right;"| >1,048  
| style="text-align:right;"| >2,254  
| style="text-align:right;"| >9,778  
|-
| 5
| style="text-align:right;"| 178 
| style="text-align:right;"| >2,173  
| style="text-align:right;"| >17,705  
| style="text-align:right;"| >98,740  
| style="text-align:right;"| >98,748  
|-
| 6
| style="text-align:right;"| 1,132 
| style="text-align:right;"| >11,191  
| style="text-align:right;"| >157,209  
| style="text-align:right;"| >786,740   
| style="text-align:right;"| >1,555,549  
|-
| 7
| style="text-align:right;"| >3,703  
| style="text-align:right;"| >48,811  
| style="text-align:right;"| >2,284,751  
| style="text-align:right;"| >15,993,257  
| style="text-align:right;"| >111,952,799  
|-
| 8
| style="text-align:right;"| >11,495  
| style="text-align:right;"| >238,400  
| style="text-align:right;"| >12,288,155  
| style="text-align:right;"| >86,017,085   
| style="text-align:right;"| >602,119,595  
|-
| 9
| style="text-align:right;"| >41,265  
| style="text-align:right;"| >932,745  
| style="text-align:right;"| >139,847,085  
| style="text-align:right;"| >978,929,595  
| style="text-align:right;"| >6,852,507,165  
|-
| 10
| style="text-align:right;"| >103,474  
| style="text-align:right;"| >4,173,724  
| style="text-align:right;"| >1,189,640,578  
| style="text-align:right;"| >8,327,484,046  
| style="text-align:right;"| >58,292,388,322  
|-
| 11
| style="text-align:right;"| >193,941  
| style="text-align:right;"| >18,603,731  
| style="text-align:right;"| >3,464,368,083  
| style="text-align:right;"| >38,108,048,913  
| style="text-align:right;"| >419,188,538,043   
|}

Van der Waerden numbers with r ≥ 2 are bounded above by

as proved by Gowers.

For a prime number p, the 2-color van der Waerden number is bounded below by

as proved by Berlekamp.

One sometimes also writes w(r; k1, k2, ..., kr) to mean the smallest number w such that any coloring of the integers {1, 2, ..., w} with r colors contains a progression of length ki of color i, for some i. Such numbers are called off-diagonal van der Waerden numbers. Thus W(r, k) = w(r; k, k, ..., k).
Following is a list of some known van der Waerden numbers:

Van der Waerden numbers are primitive recursive, as proved by Shelah; in fact he proved that they are (at most) on the fifth level  of the Grzegorczyk hierarchy.

See also
 Ramsey number
 Graph coloring

References

Further reading

External links 
 

Ramsey theory